Coleusia is a genus of Indo-Pacific pebble crabs of the family Leucosiidae. The six species currently recognised were formerly classed as members of the genus Leucosia but were separated into Coleusia in 2006 based on the fusing of segments 3-5 on the abdomens of the males and the three times axial coiling of the shaft of the first pleopod which bears a tufted lobe on its distal portion and has an elongated apical process.

Species
The following species are currently included in the genus Coleusia:

 Coleusia biannulate (Tyndale-Biscoe & George, 1962)
 Coleusia huilianae Promdam, Nabhitabhata & Galil, 2014
 Coleusia magna (Tyndale-Biscoe & George, 1962)
 Coleusia rangita Galil, 2006
 Coleusia signata (Paulson, 1875)
 Coleusia urania (Herbst, 1801)

References

Crabs